for their sponsor the Akita Sports Plus,is a football stadium in Akita, Akita Prefecture, Japan. The stadium has a capacity of 4,992 and has been the home ground of J3 League club Blaublitz Akita since 2013. It was formerly known as Akita Yabase Playing Field. Since September 2014 it had been called Akigin Stadium for the naming rights by Akita Bank.

History
The stadium was first opened in August 1953 and a roof was constructed over the main stand in September 1961. Lighting was installed in July 1978 and upgraded in September 2001. Underdrainage was installed in June 1982. The ground was converted to natural grass in November 2001. In March 2002 the end stand was renovated and a new stand opposite the main stand was constructed. Renovation of the main stand was completed in July 2004, increasing the capacity to 4,992 (including 15 wheelchair spaces). In 2007 the stadium hosted the men's soccer event of the National Sports Festival of Japan.

Facilities
The stadium is equipped with lighting for night matches, an electronic scoreboard and broadcast booth. The main stand also houses conference rooms. The main stand has seating for 1,882 people, including 10 wheelchair spaces. The end and side stands are grassed terraces that have a capacity of 1,300 and 1,800 respectively.

A second field known as the No.2 Field was built next to the stadium in October 2005. It has a synthetic turf surface and a capacity of 730 people. It is currently known as the Space Project Dream Field under a 2014 naming rights deal.

Tenants
J3 League club Blaublitz Akita has been the main tenant since 2013. The Akita Northern Bullets of the second-tier  are also based at the ground. The stadium also hosts high school and amateur soccer and rugby tournaments each year. The ground is available for use from April until November each year. The conference rooms are available for hire all year round.

Naming rights
In August 2014 the City of Akita leased the naming rights to the stadium to Akita Bank for a period of two years and seven months, from September 2014 until March 2017. The agreement was reported as being worth 3.25 million yen per year. In a separate deal announced at the same time, the naming rights of the No.2 Field was leased to the events company "Space Project" for the same time period at 720,000 yen per year.

In February 2023 the City and NPO corporation Akita Sports Plus have signed a 3-year, JPY3.3 million stadium naming-rights deal.

Access
The stadium is accessible via buses operated by the Akita Chuoukotsu Bus company. There is also a car park with 180 bays, including three reserved for wheelchair users.

Gallery

References

External links

  

Buildings and structures in Akita (city)
Football venues in Japan
Rugby union stadiums in Japan
Blaublitz Akita
Saruta Kogyo SC
Sports venues in Akita Prefecture
Sports venues completed in 1953
1953 establishments in Japan